The British 3,000 metres walk athletics champions covers the AAA Championships from 1901-1986.

Where an international athlete won the AAA Championships the highest ranking UK athlete is considered the National Champion in this list.

Past winners

nc = not contested

References

3,000 metres walk
British
British Athletics Championships